James Rupert Gill (24 September 1911 in Dublin, Ireland – 18 October 2000 in Dublin) was an Irish cricketer. A right-handed batsman, he played just once for Ireland, a first-class match against the MCC in August 1948, scoring 106 in the Ireland first innings.

He later served as president of the Irish Cricket Union in 1961.

References

1911 births
2000 deaths
Irish cricketers
Cricketers from County Dublin
Irish cricket administrators